is a Japanese professional mixed martial artist currently competing in the Lightweight division of ONE Championship. A professional competitor since 2007, he has also competed in Pancrase, Sengoku Raiden Championships and the Ultimate Fighting Championship.

Mixed martial arts career

Early career
Tokudome made his professional MMA debut in November 2007 in his native Japan.  Before signing with the UFC, he amassed a record of 11–3 with one draw over the course of the first five years of his career.

Ultimate Fighting Championship
Tokudome made his UFC debut against Cristiano Marcello on March 3, 2013, at UFC on Fuel TV 8. He won the fight via unanimous decision.

In his second fight with the promotion, Tokudome faced Norman Parke on July 6, 2013, at UFC 162. He lost the fight via unanimous decision.

Tokudome faced debuting Yui Chul Nam at The Ultimate Fighter: China Finale on March 1, 2014. He lost the back-and-forth fight via split decision.  Despite the loss on the scorecards, he was rewarded with his first Fight of the Night bonus award.

Tokudome faced promotional newcomer Johnny Case on September 20, 2014, at UFC Fight Night 52. He lost the fight via technical submission in the second round and was subsequently released from the promotion.

Pancrase
Following his release from the UFC, Tokudome competed for Pancrase from 2015 to 2017.

On November 1, 2015, he defeated Satoru Kitaoka by fourth-round technical knockout to win the King of Pancrase Lightweight Championship.

He challenged Takasuke Kume for the King of Pancrase Lightweight Championship at Pancrase 292 on December 10, 2017. He lost the fight via first-round knockout.

ONE Championship
Tokudome then signed with ONE Championship and made his promotional debut against Jadamba Narantungalag at ONE Championship: Pursuit of Power on July 13, 2018. He lost the fight via unanimous decision.

He made his sophomore appearance against Christian Lee at ONE Championship: Heart of the Lion on November 9, 2018. He lost the fight via first-round technical knockout.

He then faced Adrian Pang at ONE Championship: Warriors Of Light on May 10, 2019. He won the fight via second-round technical knockout.

He next faced Johnny Nuñez at ONE Championship: Dawn Of Valor on October 26, 2019. He won the fight via unanimous decision.

Rizin

Tokudome faced Roberto de Souza at Rizin 27 on March 21, 2021. After taking Souza down, he was quickly submitted via triangle choke in the first round.

Championships and achievements

Mixed martial arts
Ultimate Fighting Championship
Fight of the Night (one time) vs. Yui Chul Nam
Pancrase
Pancrase Lightweight Championship (one time; former)
One successful title defense

Mixed martial arts record

|-
|Loss
|align=center|20–11–1
|Roberto de Souza
|Submission (triangle choke)
|Rizin 27
|
|align=center|1
|align=center|1:44
|Nagoya, Japan
|
|-
|Win
|align=center|20–10–1
|Johnny Nuñez
|Decision (unanimous)
|ONE Championship: Dawn Of Valor
|
|align=center|3
|align=center|5:00
|Jakarta, Indonesia
|
|-
|Win
|align=center|19–10–1
|Adrian Pang
|TKO (referee stoppage)
|ONE Championship: Warriors Of Light
|
|align=center|2
|align=center|1:27
|Bangkok, Thailand
|
|-
|Loss
|align=center|18–10–1
|Christian Lee
|TKO (punches)
|ONE Championship: Heart of the Lion
|
|align=center| 1
|align=center| 2:47
|Kallang, Singapore
| 
|-
| Loss
| align=center| 18–9–1
| Jadamba Narantungalag
| Decision (unanimous) 
| ONE Championship: Pursuit of Power
| 
| align=center| 3
| align=center| 5:00
| Kuala Lumpur, Malaysia
| 
|-
| Loss
| align=center| 18–8–1
| Takasuke Kume
| KO (punch)
| Pancrase: 292
| 
| align=center| 1
| align=center| 1:21
| Tokyo, Japan
|
|-
| Win
| align=center| 18–7–1
| Kieran Joblin
| Decision (unanimous)
| Pancrase: 288
| 
| align=center| 3
| align=center| 5:00
| Tokyo, Japan
|
|-
| Win
| align=center| 17–7–1
| Akira Okada
| TKO (punches)
| Pancrase: 286
| 
| align=center| 1
| align=center| 0:28
| Tokyo, Japan
|
|-
| Loss
| align=center| 16–7–1
| Takasuke Kume
| TKO (punches)
| Pancrase: 280
| 
| align=center| 1
| align=center| 4:45
| Tokyo, Japan
| 
|-
| Win
| align=center| 16–6–1
| Akbarh Arreola
| TKO (punches)
| Pancrase: 277
| 
| align=center| 1
| align=center| 4:59
| Tokyo, Japan
| 
|-
| Win
| align=center| 15–6–1
| Satoru Kitaoka
| KO (punches)
| Pancrase: 271
| 
| align=center| 4
| align=center| 1:24
| Tokyo, Japan
| 
|-
| Win
| align=center| 14–6–1
| J.J. Ambrose
| Decision (unanimous)
| Pancrase: 267
| 
| align=center| 3
| align=center| 5:00
| Tokyo, Japan
| 
|-
| Win
| align=center| 13–6–1
| Yoshihiro Koyama
| KO (punches)
| Pancrase: 265
| 
| align=center| 1
| align=center| 1:38
| Tokyo, Japan
| 
|-
| Loss
| align=center| 12–6–1
| Johnny Case
| Technical Submission (guillotine choke)
| UFC Fight Night: Hunt vs. Nelson
| 
| align=center| 2
| align=center| 2:34
| Saitama, Japan
| 
|-
| Loss
| align=center| 12–5–1
| Yui Chul Nam
| Decision (split)
| The Ultimate Fighter China Finale: Kim vs. Hathaway
| 
| align=center| 3
| align=center| 5:00
| Macau, SAR, China
| 
|-
| Loss
| align=center| 12–4–1
| Norman Parke
| Decision (unanimous)
| UFC 162
| 
| align=center| 3
| align=center| 5:00
| Las Vegas, Nevada, United States
| 
|-
| Win
| align=center| 12–3–1
| Cristiano Marcello
| Decision (unanimous)
| UFC on Fuel TV: Silva vs. Stann
| 
| align=center| 3
| align=center| 5:00
| Saitama, Japan
| 
|-
| Win
| align=center| 11–3–1
| Kengo Ura
| Submission (armbar)
| Pancrase: Progress Tour 9
| 
| align=center| 3
| align=center| 5:00
| Tokyo, Japan
| 
|-
| Win
| align=center| 10–3–1
| Jung Hyun Jo
| Submission (armbar)
| Pancrase: Progress Tour 4
| 
| align=center| 1
| align=center| 4:51
| Tokyo, Japan
| 
|-
| Loss
| align=center| 9–3–1
| Isao Kobayashi
| TKO (punches)
| Pancrase: Impressive Tour 13
| 
| align=center| 1
| align=center| 4:14
| Tokyo, Japan
| 
|-
| Win
| align=center| 9–2–1
| Kota Okazawa
| Decision (unanimous)
| Pancrase: Impressive Tour 8
| 
| align=center| 3
| align=center| 5:00
| Tokyo, Japan
| 
|-
| Win
| align=center| 8–2–1
| Hiroki Aoki
| Decision (unanimous)
| Pancrase: Impressive Tour 4
| 
| align=center| 3
| align=center| 5:00
| Tokyo, Japan
| 
|-
| Win
| align=center| 7–2–1
| Junichi Ota
| TKO (punches)
| Pancrase: Impressive Tour 1
| 
| align=center| 1
| align=center| 2:55
| Tokyo, Japan
| 
|-
| Win
| align=center| 6–2–1
| Shigenobu Takahashi
| TKO (punches)
| Pancrase: Passion Tour 11
| 
| align=center| 1
| align=center| 3:33
| Tokyo, Japan
| 
|-
| Loss
| align=center| 5–2–1
| Maciej Gorski
| TKO (head kick & punch)
| KSW 14: Judgment Day
| 
| align=center| 1
| align=center| 3:24
| Lódz, Poland
| 
|-
| Win
| align=center| 5–1–1
| Yuma Ishizuka
| TKO (punches)
| World Victory Road Presents: Sengoku Raiden Championships 13
| 
| align=center| 1
| align=center| 3:22
| Tokyo, Japan
| 
|-
| Win
| align=center| 4–1–1
| Takafumi Ito
| TKO (punches)
| Pancrase: Passion Tour 4
| 
| align=center| 1
| align=center| 3:45
| Tokyo, Japan
| 
|-
| Win
| align=center| 3–1–1
| Arata Fujimoto
| Submission (armbar)
| GCM: Cage Force 12
| 
| align=center| 1
| align=center| 2:01
| Tokyo, Japan
| 
|-
| Win
| align=center| 2–1–1
| Takashi Ito
| TKO (doctor stoppage)
| Deep: clubDeep Hachioji
| 
| align=center| 2
| align=center| 4:14
| Tokyo, Japan
| 
|-
| Win
| align=center| 1–1–1
| Yasuhiro Kirita
| Submission (armbar)
| Zst: Swat! 25
| 
| align=center| 2
| align=center| 0:15
| Tokyo, Japan
| 
|-
| Draw
| align=center| 0–1–1
| Masayuki Hamagishi
| Draw
| Zst: Swat! 16
| 
| align=center| 2
| align=center| 5:00
| Tokyo, Japan
| 
|-
| Loss
| align=center| 0–1
| Tomohiko Yoshida
| Submission (kneebar) 
| Zst 15: Fifth Anniversary
| 
| align=center| 1
| align=center| 4:42
| Tokyo, Japan
|

References

External links
 
 

Japanese male mixed martial artists
Japanese male judoka
Japanese practitioners of Brazilian jiu-jitsu
Lightweight mixed martial artists
Mixed martial artists utilizing boxing
Mixed martial artists utilizing judo
Mixed martial artists utilizing Brazilian jiu-jitsu
1987 births
Living people
Ultimate Fighting Championship male fighters